{{DISPLAYTITLE:C20H28FN3O3}}
The molecular formula C20H28FN3O3 (molar mass: 377.453 g/mol, exact mass: 377.2115 u) may refer to:

 5F-ADB
 5F-EMB-PINACA

Molecular formulas